Seven Strange and Ghostly Tales, published in 1991, is a collection of short stories for children by the author of the Redwall series, Brian Jacques. Publishers Weekly said of the book that "Jacques's collection of original ghost stories features 'the requisite apparitions, vampires and satanic incarnations, all spun with a distinctly English flair'."

Included are:

The Fate of Thomas P. Kanne
Jamie and the Vampires
Allie/Alma
The Lies of Henry Mawdsley
Bridgey
The Sad History of Gilly Bodkin
R.S.B. Limited

References 

1991 short story collections
1991 children's books
Children's short story collections
British short story collections
Horror short story collections
Hutchinson (publisher) books